Crystle Roberson is an African-American filmmaker, writer, and television producer. She was honored by Women in Film &Television with the Woman to Watch Award in 2008. She was a director for television series including Greenleaf on the Oprah Winfrey Network, plus All American (CW), Diary of a Future President (Disney+), American Soul (BET), and more.

Career / film / television 
Today, Roberson is a member of the Directors Guild of America. Her first award from HBO, Chase, and Kodak for her short film Next Door’s Next (2009), led her to write and direct indie projects including Private Garden with Idris Elba, and The Black Cage with Mykelti Williamson.  She directed more shorts such as The End Again featuring Columbus Short and Black Girls Guide to Fertility with Raney Branch.

In 2021, she was Producing Director on ABC’s premiere season of QUEENS and 2 episodes of BMF (Black Mafia Family - Season 2) for STARZ.

Currently, she's directing Season 2 of The Gilded Age on HBO, and she's also the Producing Director for 2 episodes on Season 4 of Genius: MLK/X (episode 4 & 6).

Filmography 
Greenleaf - List of Greenleaf episodes - 2019, 2021
Queens (American TV series) - 2021
Sacrifice (TV series) 2021
American Soul - 2020
BMF (TV series) - 2023
Long Slow Exhale - 2022
Delilah (American TV series) - 2021 
Ambitions (TV series) - 2019
Diary of a Future President - 2021
Bigger (TV series) - 2019
All American - List of All American episodes - 2021, 2022

References

External links 
Official Page

African-American film directors
African-American film producers
African-American screenwriters
African-American television directors
African-American television producers
American film producers
American publicists
American television directors
American women film directors
American women film producers
American women screenwriters
Film directors from California
Film producers from California
Screenwriters from California
Television producers from California
Valdosta State University alumni
American women television directors
American women television producers
American women television writers
Writers from Long Beach, California
American television writers
21st-century African-American people
21st-century African-American women
20th-century African-American people
20th-century African-American women
Sundance Film Festival award winners
African-American women writers
Living people
Year of birth missing (living people)